is a Japanese politician of the New Komeito Party, a member of the House of Representatives in the Diet (national legislature). A native of Ōtsu, Shiga and graduate of Kyoto University, he was elected for the first time in 1993.

References

External links 
 Official website in Japanese.

1959 births
People from Ōtsu, Shiga
Living people
University of Tokyo alumni
Members of the House of Representatives from Osaka Prefecture
New Komeito politicians
21st-century Japanese politicians